Diphtheroglyphus is a genus of mites in the family Acaridae.

Species
 Diphtheroglyphus maculata Nesbitt, 1950

References

Acaridae